Ignaz Franz (born 12 October 1719 in Protzan near Frankenstein; died 19 August 1790 in Breslau) was a German Catholic priest, theologian and composer of church hymns.

Life 
Franz studied philosophy and theology at the University of Breslau. In 1742, after finishing his studies and finishing the compulsory preparatory period, he was ordained as a priest by Prince-Bishop Philipp Ludwig von Sinzendorf. Shortly thereafter he was delegated vicar of Glogau in Silesia.

In 1753, Franz was appointed archpriest in Schlawa, Silesia. In 1766 Count Philipp Gotthard von Schaffgotsch called him back to Breslau and appointed him to be the head of the episcopal seminary von Breslau. Franz also functioned as the “Assessor for Theological Affairs” at the Apostolic Vicariate.

Franz passed away in Breslau on 19 August 1790 and is buried there.

Works 
Franz was an editor of catechisms and books of hymns during the period of the Enlightenment. He is the composer of the hymn Holy God, We Praise Thy Name Großer Gott, wir loben dich (GL 1975 257, GL 2013 380, EG 331. This is a German version of the  Te Deum, the beginning of the Ambrosian Hymn of Praise. Holy God, We Praise Your Name was composed around 1770. The later melody was printed for the first time in the Katholisches Gesangbuch (Vienna 1776).

Literature 
 Constantin von Wurzbach: Franz, Ignaz. In: Biographisches Lexikon des Kaiserthums Oesterreich. 28. Theil. Kaiserlich-königliche Hof- und Staatsdruckerei, Wien 1874, S. 338 (Digitalisat).

External links 

 Großer Gott, wir loben Dich – Text
 Großer Gott, wir loben Dich – Noten, MIDI und vollständiger Text
 Großer Gott, wir loben Dich – Melodie (MID; 7 kB)
 Holy God, we praise your name
 

18th-century German composers
18th-century German Roman Catholic priests
1719 births
1790 deaths